South Humber Rabbitohs RLFC are a rugby league team from the county of Lincolnshire in England. They play in the Yorkshire & Humber Merit League.

History
The club was founded in 2006 by Nathan Price Saleh, a Welsh dual-code rugby player playing for Grimsby RUFC. Despite being just across the River Humber from the rugby league stronghold of Hull, there is no record of a club ever playing in the area. Therefore, the game between the Rabbitohs and East Riding in the MML on 13 May 2006 can be considered to be the first competitive game of rugby league in North-East Lincolnshire.

The club takes its name, and its colours, from the Australian club South Sydney Rabbitohs. Although the "Rabbitoh" is a part of Sydney's history, Lincolnshire is an agricultural county and rabbit poaching is part of its long tradition. In deference to the county colours, the club strip includes a small amount of blue in addition to the green and red.

The club logo was modified by Lee Mullen and endorsed by South Sydney Rabbitohs.

The club is closely linked with Grimsby RUFC, with players also coming from nearby Cleethorpes.

2006 was a phenomenal debut season for the Rabbitohs. They went through the regular season unbeaten, notching up a total of 386 points in 7 games, including over a hundred against local rivals Scunthorpe. In winning the league, they qualified for the final, where they beat the Nottingham Outlaws Academy by 42 points to 18.

In 2007, the Rabbitohs competed in the Rugby League Conference for the first season, after promotion from the Midlands Merit League, finishing fifth.

With a change in organisation and a number of players unavailable, the club opted to return to the RL Merit League in 2008. They finished in 6th place but did not take part in the play-offs.

2009 was another interesting year with a high number of youth players coming through the club. President Steve Clayton has now moved to Adelaide leaving the future of the club in new hands.

2011 sees two of the original Rabbitohs players taking coaching and managerial duties in that of Shane Lowery and Dan McDaid. The Rabbitohs will compete in the Yorkshire Merit League and have launched a new website for the season.

Club honours
 RL Merit League: 2006

See also

List of sports clubs inspired by others

References

External links
Official Website
Rugby League Conference
RL Merit League

2006 establishments in England
Sport in Grimsby
Rugby clubs established in 2006
Rugby League Conference teams
Rugby league teams in Lincolnshire
Diaspora sports clubs in the United Kingdom
Australian diaspora in Europe